The Chinese Ice Hockey Association (CIHA) is the governing body of ice hockey in the People's Republic of China. It has been a member of the International Ice Hockey Federation (IIHF) since 1963.

It also covered bandy in China and joined the Federation of International Bandy (FIB) in 2010. In late 2014, China Bandy Federation was founded and replaced the ice hockey association as the FIB member.

National teams
  China men's national ice hockey team
  China men's national junior ice hockey team
  China men's national under-18 ice hockey team
  China women's national ice hockey team
  China women's national under-18 ice hockey team

See also
 Beijing International Ice Hockey League
 Ice hockey in China

References

External links
Official Website
China at IIHF.com

Ice hockey in China
Ice hockey governing bodies in Asia
International Ice Hockey Federation members
Ice Hockey
Bandy in China
Bandy governing bodies
Sports organizations established in 1963